Diabolic Impious Evil' is the third studio album by Polish death metal band Azarath. It was released on 16 September 2006 by Pagan Records.

Track listing

Credits

References

2006 albums
Azarath (band) albums